Yellow Creek State Forest is a state forest in Columbiana County, Ohio, United States.

References

External links
 U.S. Geological Survey Map at the U.S. Geological Survey Map Website. Retrieved November 30th, 2022.

Ohio state forests
Protected areas of Columbiana County, Ohio